Healthy narcissism is a positive sense of self that is in alignment with the greater good. The concept of healthy narcissism was first coined by Paul Federn and gained prominence in the 1970s through the research of Heinz Kohut and Otto Kernberg. It developed slowly out of the psychoanalytic tradition, and became popular in the late twentieth century.

The concept of healthy narcissism is used in clinical psychology and popular psychology as an aid to self-assertion and success. It has indeed been suggested that it is useful to think of a continuum of narcissism, ranging from deficient to healthy to pathological, with stable narcissism and destructive narcissism as stopping-points in between.

Sigmund Freud on normal narcissism

Freud considered narcissism a natural part of the human makeup that, taken to extremes, prevents people from having meaningful relationships. He distinguished narcissism as "the libidinal complement to the egoism of the instinct of self-preservation". This self-preservation or desire and energy that drives one’s instinct to survive he referred to as a healthy trait termed primary narcissism.

Paul Federn 
Paul Federn, an Austrian physician and psychoanalyst, and acolyte of Sigmund Freud introduced the concept of healthy narcissism in the 1930s. In 1928, he published "Narcissism in the Structure of the Ego," and in 1929 "The Ego as Subject and Object in Narcissism" (Das Ich als Subjekt und Objekt im Narzissmus). It was in these works that Federn introduced the concept of healthy narcissism to describe an adequate sense of self-love.

Heinz Kohut on healthy narcissism 
Healthy narcissism was first conceptualized by Heinz Kohut, who used the descriptor "normal narcissism" and "normal narcissistic entitlement" to describe children's psychological development. Kohut's research showed that if early narcissistic needs could be adequately met, the individual would move on to what he called a "mature form of positive self-esteem; self-confidence" or healthy narcissism.

In Kohut's tradition, the features of healthy narcissism are:

 Strong self-regard.
 Empathy for others and recognition of their needs.
 Authentic self-concept.
 Self-respect and self-love.
 Courage to abide criticism from others while maintaining positive self-regard.
 Confidence to set and pursue goals and realize one's hopes and dreams.
 Emotional resilience.
 Healthy pride in self and one's accomplishments.
 The ability to admire and be admired.

Neville Symington challenged Kohut's belief in positive narcissism, arguing that "we do not get positive narcissism without self-hatred or negative narcissism." Symington held that "it is meaningless to talk about healthy self-centredness" – that being the core of narcissism.

Ernest Becker 
In his 1974 Pulitzer Prize-winning book, The Denial of Death, anthropologist Ernest Becker held that "a working level of narcissism is inseparable from self-esteem, from a basic sense of self-worth".

According to Becker:The child who is well nourished and loved develops, as we said, a sense of magical omnipotence, a sense of his own indestructibility, a feeling of proven power, and secure support. He can imagine himself, deep down, to be eternal. We might say that his repression of the idea of his own death is made easy for him because he is fortified against it in his very narcissistic vitality."Furthermore, he described healthy narcissism as:All too absorbing and relentless to be an aberration; it expresses the heart of the creature: the desire to stand out, to be the one in creation. When you combine natural narcissism with the basic need for self-esteem, you create a creature who has to feel himself an object of primary value: first in the universe, representing in himself all of life.

Ronnie Solan

Ronnie Solan uses the metaphor of narcissism as an emotional-immune system for safeguarding the familiarity and the well-being of the individual against invasion by foreign sensations (1998) and small differences (Freud 1929–1930).

The innate immunization vacillates between well-being, in the presence of the familiar, and alertness as well as vulnerability, facing the stranger. In childhood, the familiar is tempting and the strangeness is intolerable from within (illness) or from outside (otherness). Hence, narcissistic immunization might be compared to the activity of the biological immunological system that identifies the familiar protein of the cell and rejects the foreign protein (bacteria, virus).

Thus, from infancy to adulthood, getting hurt emotionally is inevitable because the other, even if he or she is a familiar person and dear to us, is still a separate individual that asserts his otherness. The healthy narcissist succeeds in updating narcissistic data (such as acquaintance with the unfamiliar) and in enabling the recovery of self-familiarity from injury and psychic pains. Healthy narcissism activates immunologic process of restoring the stabilization of cohesiveness, integrity and vigorousness of the self and the restoration of the relationship with the other, despite its otherness.
 
Impaired functioning of narcissism fails to activate these narcissistic processes and arouses destructive reactions. Thus, the individual steadfastly maintains his anger toward the other that offended him, and might sever contact with him, even to the extent of exacting violent revenge, although this other might be dear to him, possibly leading through impaired narcissism to fragility and vulnerability of the self, to immature individuation, narcissistic disorders and pathological phenomena. 
 
The healthy narcissism contributes to improving emotional intelligence as part of the process of adapting to changes; to intensifying curiosity and investigating the environment; to relating to otherness, and for enhancing joie de vivre.<ref>Solan, Ronnie (2007). 'Enigma of Childhood (in Hebrew). Modan Publishing House.</ref>

 Craig Malkin 
Craig Malkin, a lecturer in psychology at Harvard Medical School, wrote about healthy narcissism in his book 'Rethinking Narcissism'. According to Malkin,

Narcissism exists on a spectrum and unhealthy narcissism occurs when there is a deficiency of narcissism, also known as Echoism'', or when people become addicted to feeling special as in narcissistic personality disorder.

Michael Kinsey 
In clinical psychologist Michael Kinsey's model, narcissism exists on a continuum as with other personality traits. The essence of healthy narcissism is the ability to invest love in oneself and other people.  Thus it is devoid of the drive to exploit and cause harm to others as seen in narcissistic personality disorder, in which love is self-directed only.

He distinguishes trait narcissism as separate from pathological narcissism. He explains that subclinical narcissism does not manifest uniformly:

Kinsey identifies the main attributes of healthy narcissism as:

 Being able to admire others and accept admiration.
 Believe in the importance of your contributions.
 Feel gratitude and appreciation not guilt.
 Empathize with others but prioritize self.
 Embody self-efficacy, persistence and resilience.
 Respect the self in health habits and boundaries.
 Be confident in being seen.
 Tolerate other's disapproval.
 Create goals and pursue them with desire.
 Be attentive to the external world.
 Be aware of emotions.

Impact of healthy v. destructive narcissistic managers

Lubit compared healthily narcissistic managers versus destructively narcissistic managers for their long-term impact on organizations.

In a separate but related distinction, American psychoanalyst and anthropologist Michael Maccoby makes the case for “productive narcissists.” Maccoby posits that productive narcissists are ideal leaders in moments of socio-economic upheaval. He credits them with an innate skill set he calls "strategic intelligence," which includes foresight, systems thinking, visioning, motivating, and partnering. Maccoby is clear that that narcissistic leadership doesn’t necessarily lead to success, as narcissists who lacking strategic intelligence ultimately fail.

See also

References

Psychoanalytic theory
Narcissism